Paradarami is a village in Gudiyattam taluk, Vellore district, Tamil Nadu, India. It is located approximately 1 km from the border with Andhra Pradesh and it is surrounded by about 50 villages. It lies in between Gudiyattam to Chittoor State High Way. Paradarami is famous for its 4-day Gangamma carnival held annually in the month of June. 

Villages in Vellore district